The city of Córdoba in al-Andalus, under the rule of Umayyad Caliph Hisham II al-Hakam, was besieged, pillaged, and attacked  by Berbers twice: from 1009 to 1010 and from 1010 to 1013. The siege, and the massacres and sacking that followed have been linked to the decline and end of Umayyad rule.

From 1011 to 1013, the Berbers engaged in raids on the countryside as well as maintaining a blockade of Córdoba from a base at the Medina Azahara. Historian Elizabeth Nash reports that, "Berber mercenaries from North Africa stationed in Córdoba rebelled and sacked Medina Azahara, hauled down its columns, horseshoe arches and soaring vaults, demolished its elaborate water channels, bathhouses and aqueducts, plundered the ruins, then set fire to them." 

During the sacks, Córdoba was looted and its citizens were massacred, including many Jews. Prominent Jews in Córdoba, such as Samuel ibn Naghrela, were forced to flee the city in 1013.

See also
Fitna of al-Andalus
Timeline of Jewish History
List of massacres in Spain
Timeline of antisemitism
Timeline of the Muslim presence in the Iberian peninsula

References 

Anti-Jewish pogroms by Muslims
1009 in Europe
1010 in Europe
1011 in Europe
1012 in Europe
1013 in Europe
11th century in Al-Andalus
Looting